Richard H. Leftwich (born 1946) is  Fuji Bank and Heller Professor of Accounting and Finance Emeritus at the University of Chicago.

Awards
The Persian translation of his book The Price System and Resource Allocation won the Iranian Royal Book Award.

Resources

Living people
1946 births
American economists